Eija is a Finnish female given name. Its nameday is the 19th of February. As of January 2013, there are more than 24,500 people registered in Finland with this name. There are also more than 1,200 people with this name in Sweden, but only twenty-eight in Norway one in America, two in Canada, one in England and one in Australia. The origin of the name is eijaa a Finnish exclamation of joy.

Notable people
Some notable people who have this name include:
 Eija-Liisa Ahtila (born 1959), Finnish video artist and photographer
 Elja Hyytiäinen (born 1961), Finnish cross country skier 
 Eija-Riitta Korhola (born 1959), Finnish politician 
 Eija Koskivaara (born 1965), Finnish orienteering competitor 
 Eija Krogerus (born 1932), Finnish bowler
 Eija Vilpas (born 1957), Finnish actress

References

Finnish feminine given names